Ieuan Ddu ap Dafydd ab Owain (fl. 1440–1480), also known as Ieuan Dafydd Ddu and Ieuan Dafydd ab Owain, was a Welsh poet.

A number of surviving manuscripts contain cywyddau believed to have been the work of Ieuan, but the only certain example of his work appears to be the cywydd to his fellow bard, Ieuan Gethin. The first lines of some of his other writings are given in Moses Williams's Repertorium Poeticum, London, 1726, 8 vo.

Little is known about his life other than he was an eminent poet, a native of Aberdare, the gentleman of large local estate and a generous patron of other bards. However, Iolo Morganwg described him as the ancestor of the Bruce family of Dyffryn.

References

15th-century Welsh poets
Year of birth unknown
Year of death unknown
People from Aberdare
Welsh male poets